Abdelmalek Djeghbala (born March 1, 1983) is an Algerian football player. He currently plays for RC Arbaâ in the Algerian Ligue Professionnelle 1.

Club career
In 2008, Djeghbala joined USM El Harrach from NRB Touggourt. On May 1, 2011, Djeghbala started for USM El Harrach in the 2011 Algerian Cup Final against JS Kabylie. However, El Harrach lost 1-0.

Honours
 Finalist of the Algerian Cup once with USM El Harrach in 2011

References

External links
 DZFoot Profile
 

1983 births
Living people
Algerian footballers
Algerian Ligue Professionnelle 1 players
MC Alger players
USM El Harrach players
People from Touggourt
Association football defenders
Association football midfielders
21st-century Algerian people